William de Braose (died 1287) was a Bishop of Llandaff, now in modern-day Cardiff, Wales.

Dynastic Family Background
A member of the great, long lived and at times very powerful de Braose family of Norman and medieval English Marcher Lords, some of whom held key posts and vital Lordships in the Welsh Marches, this William de Braose was destined for a life in the Church.

Bishop of Llandaff
He procured the diocese of Llandaff in 1266, being consecrated on 23 May in that year.

Little is known of his episcopacy, but he is believed to have been the builder of the Lady Chapel at Llandaff Cathedral.

Memorial
His effigial monument, erected after his death on 19 March 1287, may still be seen there.

See also
House of Braose

1287 deaths
Bishops of Llandaff
13th-century Roman Catholic bishops in Wales
Year of birth unknown
13th-century Welsh clergy